Stewart "Red" Faught (January 7, 1924 – September 16, 2005) was an American football player and coach.  He served as the head football coach at Franklin College in Franklin, Indiana, from 1957 to 1988, compiling a record of 155–146–6	. As college football player, Faught was the starting quarterback at Indiana State University.

Following his tenure at Franklin, Faught joined the Georgetown Tigers staff as the offensive coordinator.  In 1991, the Tigers won the NAIA Division II Football National Championship.

Head coaching record

High school

College

References

External links
 

1924 births
2005 deaths
American football quarterbacks
Franklin Grizzlies athletic directors
Franklin Grizzlies football coaches
Georgetown Tigers football coaches
Indiana State Sycamores football players
College track and field coaches in the United States
High school football coaches in Indiana
Franklin College (Indiana) faculty
People from Sullivan, Indiana
Players of American football from Indiana